Torneio dos Campeões da CBD was a Brazilian football competition held in 1969 with the objective of qualifying a team for the 1970 Copa Libertadores. Grêmio Maringá was declared as the champions after Botafogo forfeited the final after CBD decided not to have Brazilian teams competing in the 1970 Copa Libertadores.

Participating teams

Games

(1)Santos forfeited to play the replay game thus Grêmio Maringá was awarded with a 1-0 win.
(2)Botafogo forfeited to play the finals thus Grêmio Maringá was awarded with a 1-0 win in both games.

References

1969 in Brazilian football
Defunct football competitions in Brazil